is a micro-asteroid and near-Earth object of the Apollo group on an eccentric orbit with has an estimated . It was first observed on 7 February 2018, by astronomers of the Mount Lemmon Survey at Mount Lemmon Observatory, Arizona, United States. The discovery occurred the day after its sub-lunar passage as it approached the Earth from a sunward direction, and this flyby altered the asteroid's orbit slightly.

Orbit and classification 

 belongs to the Apollo asteroids, the largest group of near-Earth objects with nearly 10 thousand known members, which cross the orbit of Earth.

Based on a high uncertainty, it orbits the Sun at a distance of 0.91–2.77 AU once every 2 years and 6 months (910 days; semi-major axis of 1.84 AU). Its orbit has an eccentricity of 0.51 and an inclination of 16° with respect to the ecliptic. With an aphelion of 2.77 AU, it is also a Mars-crosser, as it crosses the orbit of the Red Planet at 1.666 AU. The body's observation arc begins at Mount Lemmon with its first observation on 7 February 2018.

2018 flyby 

On 6 February 2018, 18:45 UTC, the day before its first observation, it had a flyby with the Earth at a nominal distance of 0.25 lunar distances (LD).

Physical characteristics 

Based on a generic magnitude-to-diameter conversion using an absolute magnitude of 28.036, the body measures between 7 and 14 meters in diameter for an assumed albedo of 0.057 and 0.20, which represent typical values for carbonaceous and stony asteroids, respectively.

As of 2018, no rotational lightcurve of  has been obtained from photometric observations. The body's rotation period, pole and shape remain unknown.

Numbering and naming 

This minor planet has not yet been numbered.

See also 
 List of asteroid close approaches to Earth in 2018
Gravity assist

References

External links 

 MPEC 2018-C69 : 2018 CF2, Minor Planet Electronic Circular, 10 February 2018
 Asteroid 2018 CF2 flew past Earth at 0.25 LD, one day before discovery, The Watchers, 11 February 2018
 
 

Minor planet object articles (unnumbered)
Discoveries by MLS
Near-Earth objects in 2018
20180207